Maywood is a borough in Bergen County, in the U.S. state of New Jersey. As of the 2020 United States census, the borough's population was 10,080, an increase of 525 (+5.5%) from the 2010 census count of 9,555, which in turn reflected an increase of 32 (+0.3%) from the 9,523 counted in the 2000 census.

Maywood was incorporated as a borough on June 29, 1894, from portions of Midland Township, based on the results of a referendum held that day. The borough was formed during the "Boroughitis" phenomenon then sweeping through Bergen County, in which 26 boroughs were formed in the county in 1894 alone. The borough's name came from the name of a station established in the area by the New Jersey Midland Railroad.

Geography
According to the United States Census Bureau, the borough had a total area of 1.29 square miles (3.34 km2), including 1.29 square miles (3.33 km2) of land and <0.01 square miles (0.01 km2) of water (0.16%).

The borough borders the Bergen County municipalities of Hackensack, Lodi, Paramus and Rochelle Park.

Demographics

2010 census

The Census Bureau's 2006–2010 American Community Survey showed that (in 2010 inflation-adjusted dollars) median household income was $82,792 (with a margin of error of +/− $3,759) and the median family income was $97,776 (+/− $5,312). Males had a median income of $62,450 (+/− $4,738) versus $54,471 (+/− $7,2865) for females. The per capita income for the borough was $36,461 (+/− $2,475). About 3.4% of families and 4.8% of the population were below the poverty line, including 5.9% of those under age 18 and 3.2% of those age 65 or over.

Same-sex couples headed 32 households in 2010, an increase from the 24 counted in 2000.

2000 census
As of the 2000 United States census there were 9,523 people, 3,710 households, and 2,626 families residing in the borough. The population density was 7,326.2 people per square mile (2,828.3/km2). There were 3,777 housing units at an average density of 2,905.7 per square mile (1,121.8/km2). The racial makeup of the borough was 84.57% White, 2.79% African American, 0.07% Native American, 7.16% Asian, 0.01% Pacific Islander, 3.31% from other races, and 2.08% from two or more races. Hispanic or Latino of any race were 11.71% of the population.

There were 3,710 households, out of which 29.1% had children under the age of 18 living with them, 56.3% were married couples living together, 11.0% had a female householder with no husband present, and 29.2% were non-families. 24.9% of all households were made up of individuals, and 13.3% had someone living alone who was 65 years of age or older. The average household size was 2.56 and the average family size was 3.09.

In the borough the population was spread out, with 21.1% under the age of 18, 6.2% from 18 to 24, 30.8% from 25 to 44, 24.4% from 45 to 64, and 17.5% who were 65 years of age or older. The median age was 40 years. For every 100 females, there were 86.9 males. For every 100 females age 18 and over, there were 83.5 males.

The median income for a household in the borough was $62,113, and the median income for a family was $73,419. Males had a median income of $49,566 versus $38,193 for females. The per capita income for the borough was $28,117. About 2.5% of families and 3.3% of the population were below the poverty line, including 4.6% of those under age 18 and 3.3% of those age 65 or over.

Economy
The central business district of the borough is located on West Pleasant Avenue from the intersection of Maywood Avenue to Lincoln Avenue, and is where most of the local restaurants and shops reside. The business district of Maywood was renovated through a "Streetscapes" grant used to fix up the sidewalks, streets and lighting.

Bergen Town Center, formerly known as the Bergen Mall, is primarily located in Paramus, with portions of the mall in Maywood.

Coca-Cola uses a coca leaf extract prepared by a Stepan Company plant in Maywood as in ingredient. The facility, which had been known as the Maywood Chemical Works (and is also a known Superfund site), was purchased by Stepan in 1959. The plant is the only commercial entity in the country authorized by the Drug Enforcement Administration to import coca leaves, which come primarily from Peru. The non-narcotic extract is sold to Coke, while the active ingredient is sold to a pharmaceutical firm for medicinal purposes.

Fake Chapter Records is an independent record label that was founded by Michael Gilligan in 1996.

Myron Corp, a manufacturer of personalized business gifts, is headquartered in Maywood.

Parks and recreation
Maywood's Memorial Park is across the street from Memorial School on Grant Avenue and is open to the public.  The park includes multiple baseball fields and a vast open field for soccer, football, running, etc.  Further back is a multi-hoop concrete basketball court; a small, fenced in dog park; and two jungle gyms with swings.  Around the circumference of the park is a 1/2-mile long bike path.

Government

Local government
Maywood  is governed under the Borough form of New Jersey municipal government, which is used in 218 municipalities (of the 564) statewide, making it the most common form of government in New Jersey. The governing body is comprised of a Mayor and a Borough Council, with all positions elected at-large on a partisan basis as part of the November general election. A Mayor is elected directly by the voters to a four-year term of office. The Borough Council is comprised of six members elected to serve three-year terms on a staggered basis, with two seats coming up for election each year in a three-year cycle. The Borough form of government used by Maywood is a "weak mayor / strong council" government in which council members act as the legislative body with the mayor presiding at meetings and voting only in the event of a tie. The mayor can veto ordinances subject to an override by a two-thirds majority vote of the council. The mayor makes committee and liaison assignments for council members, and most appointments are made by the mayor with the advice and consent of the council.

, the Mayor of Maywood is Democrat Richard Bolan, serving a term of office ending December 31, 2023. Members of the Borough Council are Council President Jacqueline S. DeMuro (D, 2025), Danyel Cicarelli (R, 2024), Samuel Conoscenti (R, 2024), Jacqueline Flynn (D, 2025), Louis D. Roer (D, 2023) and Ryan P. Ullman (D, 2023).

In January 2020, Douglas Herrick was appointed to fill an unexpired term ending in December 2021 that had been held by Richard Bolan until he resigned from his council seat to assume the mayoralty. Louis Roer was also appointed to fill an unexpired term ending in December 2020.

Federal, state, and county representation
Maywood is located in the 5th and 9th Congressional Districts and is part of New Jersey's 38th state legislative district. 

Prior to the 2011 reapportionment following the 2010 Census, Maywood had been in the 37th state legislative district.

Politics
As of March 2011, there were a total of 5,711 registered voters in Maywood, of which 1,872 (32.8% vs. 31.7% countywide) were registered as Democrats, 1,066 (18.7% vs. 21.1%) were registered as Republicans and 2,767 (48.5% vs. 47.1%) were registered as Unaffiliated. There were 6 voters registered as Libertarians or Greens. Among the borough's 2010 Census population, 59.8% (vs. 57.1% in Bergen County) were registered to vote, including 75.7% of those ages 18 and over (vs. 73.7% countywide).

In the 2016 presidential election, Democrat Hillary Clinton received 2,476 votes (53.8% vs. 54.2% countywide), ahead of Republican Donald Trump with 1,696 votes (42.8% vs. 41.1%) and other candidates with 157 votes (3.4% vs. 4.6%), among the 4,660 ballots cast by the borough's 6,309 registered voters, for a turnout of 73.4% (vs. 72.5% in Bergen County). In the 2012 presidential election, Democrat Barack Obama received 2,513 votes (56.3% vs. 54.8% countywide), ahead of Republican Mitt Romney with 1,877 votes (42.1% vs. 43.5%) and other candidates with 47 votes (1.1% vs. 0.9%), among the 4,462 ballots cast by the borough's 6,047 registered voters, for a turnout of 73.8% (vs. 70.4% in Bergen County). In the 2008 presidential election, Democrat Barack Obama received 2,564 votes (54.0% vs. 53.9% countywide), ahead of Republican John McCain with 2,087 votes (43.9% vs. 44.5%) and other candidates with 49 votes (1.0% vs. 0.8%), among the 4,752 ballots cast by the borough's 5,992 registered voters, for a turnout of 79.3% (vs. 76.8% in Bergen County). In the 2004 presidential election, Democrat John Kerry received 2,293 votes (50.5% vs. 51.7% countywide), ahead of Republican George W. Bush with 2,184 votes (48.1% vs. 47.2%) and other candidates with 43 votes (0.9% vs. 0.7%), among the 4,540 ballots cast by the borough's 5,752 registered voters, for a turnout of 78.9% (vs. 76.9% in the whole county).

In the 2013 gubernatorial election, Republican Chris Christie received 61.0% of the vote (1,708 cast), ahead of Democrat Barbara Buono with 37.6% (1,052 votes), and other candidates with 1.4% (39 votes), among the 2,898 ballots cast by the borough's 5,850 registered voters (99 ballots were spoiled), for a turnout of 49.5%. In the 2009 gubernatorial election, Democrat Jon Corzine received 1,352 ballots cast (46.4% vs. 48.0% countywide), ahead of Republican Chris Christie with 1,340 votes (46.0% vs. 45.8%), Independent Chris Daggett with 165 votes (5.7% vs. 4.7%) and other candidates with 26 votes (0.9% vs. 0.5%), among the 2,911 ballots cast by the borough's 5,850 registered voters, yielding a 49.8% turnout (vs. 50.0% in the county).

Education
The Maywood Public Schools serve students in pre-kindergarten through eighth grade. As of the 2018–19 school year, the district, comprised of two schools, had an enrollment of 1,001 students and 79.9 classroom teachers (on an FTE basis), for a student–teacher ratio of 12.5:1. Schools in the district (with 2018–19 enrollment from the National Center for Education Statistics) are 
Memorial School with 430 students in grades Pre-K–3 and 
Maywood Avenue School with 560 students in grades 4–8.

The district offers a wide variety of after school activities ranging from cheerleading to chess club, and where all students have the opportunity to contribute to their school newspaper, The Hawk (Grades 6–8), and the school's new newspaper,The Mini Hawk (Grades 4 and 5), and eighth graders may assist with their yearbook. For the 1996–1997 school year, Memorial School was formally recognized with the National Blue Ribbon School Award of Excellence, the highest honor that an American school can achieve.

For many years, after graduating from Maywood Avenue School, students in public school for ninth through twelfth grades had attended Hackensack High School in Hackensack, as part of a sending/receiving relationship with the Hackensack Public Schools, together with students from Rochelle Park and South Hackensack. Before that, they had been a sending district to Bogota High School. In March 2020, the district received approval from the New Jersey Department of Education to end the relationship it had established with Hackensack in 1969 and will begin transitioning incoming ninth graders to Henry P. Becton Regional High School, which serves students from Carlstadt and East Rutherford, beginning in the 2020–2021 school year. The transition would be complete after the final group of twelfth graders graduates from Hackensack High School at the end of the 2023–2024 school year.

Public school students from the borough, and all of Bergen County, are eligible to attend the secondary education programs offered by the Bergen County Technical Schools, which include the Bergen County Academies in Hackensack, and the Bergen Tech campus in Teterboro or Paramus. The district offers programs on a shared-time or full-time basis, with admission based on a selective application process and tuition covered by the student's home school district.

Emergency services
The Maywood Police Department has been serving the community since 1894 and has a force of 22 sworn officers. Maywood Police Communications is staffed by certified EMD Telecommunicators who handle all local 9-1-1 emergency calls and dispatches all emergency services. Maywood also has sworn Class 1 Special Law Enforcement Officers who assist with traffic control and park patrols.

After the Maywood First Aid and Emergency Squad closed in 2017, the borough sought to identify a provider to provide alternate coverage. Residents receive emergency medical services under a contractual agreement with Hackensack University Medical Center.

Maywood has an all-volunteer fire department. There are two fire stations in Maywood. Station 1 (T17-E18) is located on Park Avenue and Station 2 (E19-R23) is located on West Hunter Avenue. Maywood also houses a Fire Police department that was founded in 1926. The Fire Police assist both fire and police departments.

Religion
Maywood is home to Our Lady Queen of Peace Roman Catholic Church, First Presbyterian Church, Lutheran Church of the Redeemer, Zion Lutheran Church, St. Martin's Episcopal Church, and Temple Beth Israel, a Reconstructionist synagogue established in 1928, which moved to its current location in 1931.

Transportation

Roads and highways

Route 17 is the most significant highway passing through Maywood. Other main roads in Maywood include Maywood Avenue, Central Avenue, Passaic Street, and Spring Valley Road. The Garden State Parkway, Interstate 80 and Route 4 are all accessible in neighboring municipalities.

Public transportation
NJ Transit bus routes 144, 145, 148, 162, 163 and 164 serve the Port Authority Bus Terminal in Midtown Manhattan; The 175 route serves the George Washington Bridge Bus Terminal; and the 712, 751, 752, 753, 755, 758 and 770 provide local service in New Jersey.

The borough provides a shuttle three days a week operating from the senior center.

Historic sites

The Maywood Train Station was restored after a proposal was made by the borough in 2002 to consider demolishing the landmark. It has been listed on the National Register of Historic Places since 2003 as Building #03000487. The station was restored by the all-volunteer, non-profit Maywood Station Historical Committee, who now operate the historic site as the Maywood Station Museum.

The Oldis-Brinckerhoff House, located on Maywood Avenue, was significant during the period of the 1700s and 1800s. It was placed on the National Register of Historic Places on January 10, 1983.

With a main wing dating back to  1780, the Romine-Van Voorhis House, located on Maywood Avenue near the Oldis-Brinckerhoff House, was also placed on the National Register of Historic Places on January 10, 1983.

Notable people

People who were born in, residents of, or otherwise closely associated with Maywood include:

 Beverly Armstrong (born 1934), pitcher who played for the Rockford Peaches of the All-American Girls Professional Baseball League
 Regina Carter (born 1966), jazz violinist
 Tim Eustace (born 1956), member of the New Jersey General Assembly from 2011 to 2018, who served as mayor of Maywood from 2008 to 2012
 Barbie Ferreira (born 1996), model and actress who has appeared in HBO's Euphoria
 Alvester Garnett (born 1970), jazz drummer
 Edward H. Hynes (born 1946), politician who served two terms in the New Jersey General Assembly
 Henry Jager (born 1879 – ?), politician who was elected to the New York State Assembly as a Socialist, until he was removed from office based on his being a resident of Maywood
 James J. Maher, President of Niagara University
 Walter G. Schroeder (born 1927), politician who was a member of the Oregon House of Representatives from 1985 to 1993
 William Lee Stoddart (1868–1940), architect
 Danny Tamberelli (born 1982), child actor known for his appearances on TV in The Adventures of Pete & Pete and The Magic School Bus, as well as appearing in the films Igby Goes Down and The Mighty Ducks Justin Trattou (born 1988), defensive end who has played in the NFL for the New York Giants and Minnesota Vikings
 Alex Vincent (born 1981), known for his roles as a child actor in the Child's Play movies
 Ellen Zavian (born 1963), sports agent and attorney who was the National Football League's first female attorney-agent

References

Further reading

 Municipal Incorporations of the State of New Jersey (according to Counties)'' prepared by the Division of Local Government, Department of the Treasury (New Jersey); December 1, 1958.
 Clayton, W. Woodford; and Nelson, William. History of Bergen and Passaic Counties, New Jersey, with Biographical Sketches of Many of its Pioneers and Prominent Men., Philadelphia: Everts and Peck, 1882.
 Harvey, Cornelius Burnham (ed.), Genealogical History of Hudson and Bergen Counties, New Jersey. New York: New Jersey Genealogical Publishing Co., 1900.
 Kaminski, Edward S. (2010). Maywood – The Borough, The Railroad, and The Station., Arcadia Publishing, .
 Van Valen, James M. History of Bergen County, New Jersey. New York: New Jersey Publishing and Engraving Co., 1900.
 Westervelt, Frances A. (Frances Augusta), 1858–1942, History of Bergen County, New Jersey, 1630–1923, Lewis Historical Publishing Company, 1923.

External links

 Maywood official website
 Maywood Public Schools
 
 Data for Maywood Public Schools, National Center for Education Statistics
 Hackensack High School
 Statistical data on Maywood
 FUSRAP Maywood Superfund Site
 Maywood First Aid Squad at the World Trade Center 9/11/2001 – 9/12/2001
 Maywood Station Museum

 
1894 establishments in New Jersey
Borough form of New Jersey government
Boroughs in Bergen County, New Jersey
Populated places established in 1894